Robert Shaw Kerr (August 16, 1917 - November 18, 1988) was seventh bishop of the Episcopal Diocese of Vermont, serving from 1974 to 1986.

Biography
Kerr studied at Trinity College in Connecticut and graduated with a Bachelor of Arts in 1940. Later he trained at the General Theological Seminary. Upon graduation in 1943, he was ordained deacon on February 28, 1943 by Bishop James De Wolf Perry of Rhode Island in Trinity church, Newport, Rhode Island. He was ordained priest on September 29 of the same year. Kerr served for some time as assistant at Cathedral of St John the Divine in New York City. He also served for some time as rector of St John's Church in Barre, Vermont. In 1949 he became rector of Immanuel Church in Bellows Falls, Vermont. He also served as Dean of St Paul's Cathedral in Burlington, Vermont. In 1973, Kerr was elected Coadjutor Bishop of Vermont and was consecrated on March 16, 1974. After three months, on June 12, 1974, he succeeded as diocesan. He retired in 1986 and died in Burlington on November 18, 1988 because of a heart attack.

External links 
New York Times obituary

Trinity College (Connecticut) alumni
General Theological Seminary alumni
People from Newport, Rhode Island
1917 births
1988 deaths
20th-century American Episcopalians
Episcopal bishops of Vermont
20th-century American clergy